ACG may refer to:

Science, technology, and health care 

 A codon of threonine in genome expression
 Acoustocerebrography, a transcranial acoustic diagnostic method
 Alternating current generator, a type of electric generator
 American College of Gastroenterology, a professional association of gastroenterologists
 Angiocardiography, contrast radiography of the heart and great vessels
 Angle closure glaucoma, a type of glaucoma
 Anterior cingulate gyrus, a part of the cingulate cortex
 Apexcardiogram, a graphical recording of the pulsations of the chest wall over the apex of the heart

Places 

 Acocks Green railway station, in the UK, from its National Railway code
 Área de Conservación Guanacaste, a network of protected areas and a World Heritage site in northwestern Costa Rica
 Azeri-Chirag-Guneshli, an oilfield in the Caspian Sea

Education and business organizations 

 Academic Colleges Group, a New Zealand Educational Company
 Air Cargo Germany, a former cargo airline
 The Air Combat Group RAAF of the Royal Australian Air Force
 American College for Girls, now called Robert College, of Istanbul
 American College of Greece, an academic institution in Greece
 Associated Carrier Group, a US industry association of CDMA cellular network operators
 Association for Corporate Growth, an organization providing a global community for mergers and acquisitions and corporate growth professionals

Entertainment 

 ACG (subculture), Anime, Comics and Games subculture in Greater China
 American Comics Group, a comic-book publisher in the Golden Age of comic books
 Ashby Computers & Graphics, video game developer trading as Ultimate Play the Game

Other uses 

 Academic Competitiveness Grant, an assistance grant for college students in the US
 Atlético Clube Goianiense, is a Brazilian football team